Gourgé is a commune in the Deux-Sèvres department in the Nouvelle-Aquitaine region in western France. It is located at a  distance from Parthenay.

Description
The municipality, extending to 50.4 km2, had 918 inhabitants at the last census in 2006. With a density of 18.2 inhabitants per square km, Gourgé has experienced a rise of 0.1% in its population since 1999. Surrounded by the communes of Lhoumois, Lageon and Aubigny, Gourgé is located 27 km to the south-east of Bressuire, the largest city of the area. The village is at an altitude of 127 meters. The Thouet and Cebron rivers are the main water courses in the village. 

Gourgé's inhabitants are called Gourgéens and Gourgéennes. The village's mayor is Gilles Hamel.

The village is located on one of the Compostella routes. It is also a starting point for a number of cycle and walking routes along the Thouet valley. The commune is some 40 km away from to the Loire-Anjou-Touraine regional natural park.

Monuments 
Gourgé has a ninth-century church and an old Roman bridge over the River Thouet.

Events 
The village hosts a medieval fair.

See also
 Thouet river
Communes of the Deux-Sèvres department

References

Communes of Deux-Sèvres